Route 79 is a  state highway in southern Connecticut from Madison to Durham.

Route description
Route 79 begins at US 1 in Madison center and heads north across I-95 (at Exit 61). It continues north, intersecting with Horse Pond Road (an unsigned state road designated as Special Service Road 450), which leads to the town offices, and eventually, Hammonasset Beach State Park. Route 79 continues into the village of North Madison where it has an intersection with Route 80 at a roundabout. The road continues north into the town of Killingworth, intersecting Route 148 just south of the town line with Durham. The road runs north for another  within Durham before ending at Route 17 south of the town center. Route 79 is known as Durham Road within Madison, Madison-Durham Road within Killingworth, and Madison Road within Durham.

History
In the 19th century, the road from Madison to Durham was known as the Durham and East Guilford Turnpike, a private toll-road established in 1811. When the state took over maintenance of trunkline routes in 1922, the alignment of the old turnpike was designated as State Highway 190. Route 79 was established in the 1932 state highway renumbering as a simple number change of old Highway 190. Portions of the route in Madison were straightened in the 1940s.

Junction list

References

External links

079
Transportation in Middlesex County, Connecticut
Transportation in New Haven County, Connecticut